Lake Darby is an unincorporated community and census-designated place in Franklin County, Ohio, United States, located mostly in Prairie Township and partly in Brown Township. It is more commonly known among locals as Darby Estates, which is also the name of the older housing development there, with the newer development called "West Point". As of the 2010 census, the CDP had a population of 4,592, up from 3,727 at the 2000 census.

Geography
Lake Darby is located in western Franklin County at  (39.961630, -83.233059). The majority of the community is in Prairie Township, with two portions extending north into Brown Township. Big Darby Creek, a tributary of the Scioto River, forms the western border of the CDP as well as the Franklin County/Madison County line. The village of West Jefferson lies directly across the creek from Lake Darby.

U.S. Route 40 (National Road), a four-lane highway, forms the southern edge of the community, leading east  to downtown Columbus and west  to Springfield, Ohio.

Demographics

As of the census of 2000, there were 3,727 people, 1,198 households, and 1,041 families residing in the CDP. The population density was 1,094.4 people per square mile (422.0/km2). There were 1,238 housing units at an average density of 363.5/sq mi (140.2/km2). The racial makeup of the CDP was 94.18% White, 1.91% African American, 0.35% Native American, 0.56% Asian, 0.03% Pacific Islander, 0.86% from other races, and 2.12% from two or more races. Hispanic or Latino of any race were 1.56% of the population.

There were 1,198 households, out of which 53.6% had children under the age of 18 living with them, 72.6% were married couples living together, 10.4% had a female householder with no husband present, and 13.1% were non-families. 10.1% of all households were made up of individuals, and 0.5% had someone living alone who was 65 years of age or older. The average household size was 3.10 and the average family size was 3.31.

The population was spread out, with 33.9% under the age of 18, 6.1% from 18 to 24, 40.5% from 25 to 44, 17.3% from 45 to 64, and 2.0% who were 65 years of age or older. The median age was 30 years. For every 100 females there were 97.0 males. For every 100 females age 18 and over, there were 97.8 males.

The median income for a household in the CDP was $61,843, and the median income for a family was $61,474. Males had a median income of $36,293 versus $30,385 for females. The per capita income for the CDP was $23,079. About 1.1% of families and 1.9% of the population were below the poverty line, including 2.4% of those under age 18 and none of those age 65 or over.

General information
Lake Darby's water is supplied by Aqua Ohio. The water is extracted from an aquifer using two wells.

Lake Darby comprises three subdivisions, Lake Darby Estates, Westpoint, and Westpoint North.

References

Census-designated places in Franklin County, Ohio